Mogapi is a village in Central District of Botswana. The village is located 47 km south of Selebi-Phikwe and is less than 100 km from the border with South Africa. The population was 1,814 in 2001 census.

References

Populated places in Central District (Botswana)
Villages in Botswana